Chitta Ranjan Dutta Bir Uttom (1 January 1927 – 26 August 2020), also known as C R Dutta, was a Bangladeshi war hero who served as major-general of the Bangladesh Army. He was a key sector commander of the Mukti Bahini during the Bangladesh Liberation War. After independence, he served as the armed forces commander in Rangpur and later went on to become the first director-general of the Bangladesh Rifles (present-day Border Guards Bangladesh) in 1973.

Dutta was a prominent minority rights advocate in Bangladesh. He was also the president of the Bangladesh Hindu Buddhist Christian Unity Council.

Early life 
Dutta was born on 1 January 1929 to Upendra Chandra Dutta and Labanyaprabha Dutta. The ancestral village of Dutta of Mirashi was in erstwhile Sylhet district, presently in Chunarughat Upazila of Habiganj District in Sylhet Division of Bangladesh. His father was a police officer posted in Shillong, the then capital of Assam in British India and so he was born in Shillong. He started his schooling in Laban Government High School in Shillong, but moved to Habiganj after second grade. In 1944, he appeared for Entrance from Habiganj Government High School. Later he took admission at Asutosh College of the University of Calcutta in science. However, he left Asutosh College and completed his B.Sc. from Daulatpur College in Khulna.

Army career 
In 1950, after completing his graduation, Dutta joined the Pakistan Military Academy, Kakul. He was commissioned in 1952 as a second lieutenant in a Piffer unit with a majority of Pathan jawans. After completing his YO Course from Quetta Staff College, he was posted in Hyderabad, Sindh. He was one of the few Hindu officers in the 1950s in the Pakistan Army. There were only a handful of other Hindu officers in the Pakistan Army:, one M.N. Chakraborty of the Baloch Regiment who resigned as a captain in 1950 and transferred to India, one G.C. Bose of 1 East Bengal Regiment who retired as a major in 1957, and an M.N. Saha of 26th Jacob's Mountain Battery who retired as a lieutenant colonel of the EPR in 1962. During the 1950s and 1960s, he commanded a rifles platoon, served as adjutant of a rifle company (1954–57), adjutant of an infantry battalion (1958–1960) and commanded an infantry company as major (1962–1964). For a time he was the brigade major in a Frontier Corps brigade based in Peshawar and then the principal of the East Pakistan Rifles Training Depot (1962–64). During the 1965 Indo-Pakistan War, then Major Dutta served as a wing commander in the East Pakistan Rifles. Between 1968 and 1970, he was adjutant of the Gilgit Scouts in Skardu. In 1970, Major Dutta was serving in the Quartermaster Branch of the 12th Infantry Division at Quetta. In January 1971, he had taken a three-month leave and was staying at his Habiganj residence. After Mujibur Rahman's 7 March speech, Dutta mentally prepared himself for a possible war. However, as the Pakistani occupation army launched the Operation Searchlight, Dutta wasn't initially aware of the widespread repression and torture. At that time he attended a meeting of the political leaders at the house of his neighbour Colonel Abdur Rab. Following the meeting, Dutta decided to fight for the independence of Bangladesh. During the Bangladesh Liberation War, Dutta became the sector commander of Sector 4, which covered the whole of the present Sylhet Division and some of adjoining areas. After the war, in 1972, Dutta was appointed as brigade commander in Rangpur. In 1973, formed the Bangladesh Rifles. He became the first director general of Bangladesh Rifles. In late 1973 he ordered BDR to attack holdouts of Chakma separatists who had collaborated with the Pakistan Army and ordered expulsion of civilians and burning of huts in the Chittagong Hill Tracts. He later on regretted this decision

Rights advocacy 
The liberation war of Bangladesh was fought on the principles of Bengali nationalism. The 1972 Constitution of Bangladesh included the principles of the democracy, secularism, socialism and Bengali nationalism at the four pillars of the nation. After the assassination of Sheikh Mujibur Rahman, successive military regimes gradually removed the founding principles by Islamic principles. On 9 June 1988, Islam was declared as the state religion of Bangladesh. Major General (Retd.) Chitta Ranjan Dutta along with minority leaders from other communities founded the Bangladesh Hindu Buddhist Christian Unity Council.

Since the foundation, Dutta served as the President of the organization in uninterrupted manner. As the president Dutta fought tirelessly for the rights of the minorities. Dutta campaigned for the return of the properties confiscated using the Vested Property Act to their rightful owners. Dutta was also vocal on removal of Islam as the state religion of Bangladesh and supported the restoration of 1972 Constitution of Bangladesh.

References 

1927 births
2020 deaths
Asutosh College alumni
University of Calcutta alumni
Generals of the Bangladesh Liberation War
Bangladesh Army generals
Mukti Bahini personnel
Director Generals of Border Guards Bangladesh
Recipients of the Bir Uttom
Bengali Hindus
Bangladeshi Hindus
Bangladeshi secularists
People from Shillong
People associated with Shillong